Kam Tsin Wai is a village located in the south of Shek Kong Airfield, in Pat Heung, Yuen Long District, Hong Kong.

Administration
Kam Tsin Wai is a recognized village under the New Territories Small House Policy.

History
The village was built for the settlement of members of the Cheng clan, who moved from six villages in the Shing Mun Valley at the time of the construction of the Shing Mun Reservoir in 1928. At that time, most of the Chengs, including 540 villagers from 84 families, moved to the new village of Shing Mun San Tsuen in Kam Tin, while others dispersed to Wo Hop Shek and Pan Chung. A small number moved to Kam Tsin Wai. Kam Tsin Wai consisted of 25 village houses built by green bricks.

Features
The Cheng Hon Pang Ancestral Hall was built in 1929. It was later converted into a Catholic church called Our Lady of Sorrows Chapel, which was served from S.S. Peter and Paul Church in Yuen Long District (built in 1925 in Tung Tau Tsuen, S.S. Peter and Paul Church was relocated and rebuilt at No. 201 Castle Peak Road, near Shui Pin Tsuen, in 1958). The Chengs later redeemed the ancestral hall from the Catholic Church in the mid-1960s and the church at the hall was closed.

References

External links

 Delineation of area of existing village Kam Tsin Wai Tsuen (Pat Heung) for election of resident representative (2019 to 2022)
 Antiquities Advisory Board. Pictures of the Cheng Hon Pang Ancestral Hall, Kam Tsin Wai, Pat Heung
 Antiquities Advisory Board. Historic Building Appraisal. Kong Ha Wai – Main Building. Pictures
 Antiquities Advisory Board. Historic Building Appraisal. Kong Ha Wai –Entrance Gate. Pictures
 Antiquities Advisory Board. Historic Building Appraisal. Kong Ha Wai – Servants' Quarters. Pictures

Villages in Yuen Long District, Hong Kong
Pat Heung